Inside Woody Allen is an American gag-a-day celebrity comics comic strip about the comedian and filmmaker Woody Allen. Drawn by Stuart Hample, the strip ran from October 4, 1976, to April 8, 1984.

The strip's first year was credited to a pseudonym, Joe Marthen. Hample's name appeared on the strip starting September 19, 1977.

Characters and story
The strip was based on Allen's comedic persona and focused on his neuroses, angst, sexual frustration and frequent psychiatric treatment.

Writers for the strip included David Weinberger.

Collected editions
A collection of some strips was published in 1978 as  Non-Being and Somethingness: Selections from the Comic Strip Inside Woody Allen and features an introduction by Buckminster Fuller. Another volume, Dread and Superficiality: Woody Allen as Comic Strip was published in 2009.

In Annie Hall
Allen's 1977 film Annie Hall contains animated scenes based on Hample's artwork, though the actual animation was done by Chris Ishii.

See also
List of newspaper comic strips

References 

American comic strips
Cultural depictions of Woody Allen
Gag-a-day comics
Satirical comics
Slice of life comics
1976 comics debuts
1984 comics endings
Comics based on films
Comic strips based on real people
Comics set in New York City
Psychotherapy in fiction